Varetha is a village in Kheralu Taluka in Mahesana district of Gujarat, India. Popularly known as Vairathnagar

References

Villages in Mehsana district